Mecodina praecipua is a moth of the family Noctuidae first described by Francis Walker in 1865.

Distribution
It is found in the Indian subregion, Sri Lanka, New Guinea, Hong Kong, Taiwan, Queensland in Australia, Japan and the Bismarck Islands.

Description
Its wingspan is 5 cm. Antennae very long, reaching approximately to the forewing apex in males. Distal margin of forewing is rounded, and the hindwing is also almost circular. Costal triangle of the wingtip is dark, bounded all round with a slightly paler line, and truncated at its dorsal end. A small black dumbbell-shaped mark is found near the middle of the forewing. Hindwing is much more uniform and pale at the base, gradually turns to very dark brown, almost black. Larva spindle shaped, with a pale dull yellowish-green head which is getting darker slightly ventrally. All prolegs are equally developed. Body bright grass green, with a lateral yellow line and it has yellow spiracles. Caterpillars are known to feed on Ichnocarpus and Aglaia species. Pupation occurs in a loosely constructed oval-shaped cell in the soil. Pupa lacks bloom.

References

Moths of Asia
Moths described in 1865